Sesame oil is an edible vegetable oil derived from sesame seeds.  The oil is one of the earliest-known crop-based oils. Worldwide mass modern production is limited due to the inefficient manual harvesting process required to extract the oil. Oil made from raw seeds, which may or may not be cold-pressed, is used as a cooking oil. Oil made from toasted seeds is used for its distinctive nutty aroma and taste, although it may be unsuitable for frying, which makes it taste burnt and bitter.

Composition 
Sesame oil is composed of the following fatty acids: linoleic acid (41% of total), oleic acid (39%), palmitic acid (8%), stearic acid (5%) and others in small amounts.

History

Historically, sesame was cultivated more than 5000 years ago as a drought-tolerant crop which was able to grow where other crops failed. Sesame seeds were one of the first crops processed for oil as well as one of the earliest condiments.  Sesame was cultivated during the Indus Valley civilization and was the main oil crop. It was probably exported to Mesopotamia around 2500 BCE.

Manufacture

Manufacturing process
  

Sesame seeds are protected by a capsule which bursts only when the seeds are completely ripe, a process called dehiscence. The dehiscence time tends to vary, so farmers cut plants by hand and place them together in an upright position to continue ripening, until all the capsules have opened. The discovery of an indehiscent mutant (analogous to nonshattering domestic grains) by Langham in 1943 began the work towards development of a high-yielding, dehiscence-resistant variety. Although researchers have made significant progress in sesame breeding, harvest losses due to dehiscence continue to limit domestic US production.

Tanzania remains the largest producer of sesame oil and also dominates the global consumption of this product. The African and Asian regions constitute the fastest-developing sesame oil markets. The steady growth in demand being observed here is in line with rising household income and urbanization, as well as an increase in the use of sesame oil for food products and Asian dishes.

While some manufacturers will further refine sesame oil through solvent extraction, neutralization, and bleaching in order to improve its cosmetic aspects, sesame oil derived from quality seeds already possesses a pleasant taste and does not require further purification before it can be consumed. Many consumers prefer unrefined sesame oil due to their belief that the refining process removes important nutrients. Flavor, traditionally an important attribute, was best in oils produced from mild crushing.

Sesame oil is one of the more stable natural oils, but can still benefit from refrigeration and from limited exposure to light and high temperatures during extraction, processing, and storage; this minimizes nutrient loss through oxidation and rancidity. Storage in amber-colored or opaque bottles can help to minimize light exposure.

Sesame oil is a polyunsaturated (PUFA) semi-drying oil. Commercial sesame oil varies in color from light to deep reddish-yellow depending on the color of the seed processed and the method of milling. Provided that the oil is milled from well-cleaned seed, it can be refined and bleached easily to yield a light-colored limpid oil. Sesame oil is rich in oleic and linoleic acids, which together account for 85% of the total fatty acids. Sesame oil has a relatively high percentage of unsaponifiable matter (1.5-2.3%). In India and in some other European countries, it is obligatory to add sesame oil (5-10%) to margarine and generally to hydrogenated vegetable fats which are commonly used as adulterants for butter or ghee.

Sesame seed market
The market for sesame oil is mainly located in Asia and the Middle East, where the use of domestically-produced sesame oil has been a tradition for centuries. About 65% of the annual US sesame crop is processed into oil, and 35% is used in food.

Cold pressed sesame oil is unbleached, unrefined and cold-pressed which has a fresh aroma of sesame. For cooking and dietary purpose, cold-pressed sesame oil is one of the healthiest cooking oil with numerous health benefits.

Varieties
There are many variations in coloration: cold-pressed sesame oil is pale yellow, while Indian sesame oil (gingelly or til oil) is golden. East Asian sesame oils are commonly made with roasted/toasted sesame seeds, and are dark brown, with a different flavor.

Sesame oil is traded in any of the forms described above. Cold-pressed sesame oil is available in Western health shops. Unroasted (but not necessarily cold-pressed) sesame oil is commonly used for cooking in South India, the Middle East, halal markets, and East Asian countries. Toasted sesame oil is used for its flavor.

Nutrients
The only essential nutrient having significant content in sesame oil is vitamin K, providing 17% of the Daily Value per 100 grams (ml) consumed supplying 884 calories (table). For fats, sesame oil is approximately equal in monounsaturated fat (oleic acid, 40% of total) and polyunsaturated fat (linoleic acid, 42% of total), together accounting for 80% of the total fat content (table). The remaining oil content is primarily  palmitic acid, a saturated fat (about 9% of total, USDA table).

Uses

Cooking
Sesame oil made from seeds that have not been toasted is a pale yellow liquid with a pleasant grain-like odor and somewhat nutty taste, and is used as frying oil. Oil made from pressed and toasted sesame seeds is amber-colored and aromatic, and is used as a flavoring agent in the final stages of cooking.

Despite sesame oil's high proportion (41%) of polyunsaturated (omega-6) fatty acids, it is least prone, among cooking oils with high smoke points, to turn rancid when kept in the open. This is due to the natural antioxidants, such as sesamol, present in the oil.

Light sesame oil has a high smoke point and is suitable for deep-frying. Toasted sesame oil is not suitable, but it can be used to stir fry meats and vegetables, for sautéing, and to make omelettes.

Sesame oil is most popular in continental Asia, especially in East Asia and the South Indian states of Karnataka, Andhra Pradesh, and Tamil Nadu, where its widespread use is similar to that of olive oil in the Mediterranean.

 East Asian cuisines often use roasted sesame oil for seasoning during cooking, or at the table.
The Chinese use sesame oil in the preparation of meals.
 In Japan, rāyu is a paste made of chili-sesame oil seasoning and used as a spicy topping on various foods, or mixed with vinegar and soy sauce and used as a dip.
 In South India, before the advent of modern refined oils produced on a large scale, sesame oil was traditionally used for curries and gravies. It continues to be used, particularly in Tamil Nadu and Andhra Pradesh, mixed with foods that are hot and spicy, as it neutralizes the heat. It is often mixed in with a special spice powder that accompanies idli and dosa, as well as rice mixed with spice powders (such as paruppu podi).

Religious uses

In Mandaeism, anointing sesame oil, called misha in Mandaic, is used during rituals such as the masbuta (baptism) and masiqta (death mass), both of which are performed by Mandaean priests.

Industrial uses
In industry, sesame oil may be used as:
a solvent in injected drugs or intravenous drip solutions
a cosmetics carrier oil
a coating for stored grains to prevent weevil attacks.  The oil also has synergy effects with some insecticides.

Low-grade oil is used locally in soaps, paints, lubricants, and illuminants.

Allergy 
As with numerous seed and nut foods, sesame oil may produce an allergic reaction, although the incidence of this effect is rare, estimated at 0.1–0.2% of the population. Reports of sesame allergy are growing in developed countries during the 21st century, with the allergic mechanism from oil exposure expressed as contact dermatitis, possibly resulting from hypersensitivity to lignin-like compounds.

Research
Although preliminary research on the potential effect of sesame oil on inflammation and atherosclerosis has been conducted, there was insufficient quality of the studies to allow any conclusions.

See also
Peanut oil
Sesame
Tahini

References

Chinese condiments
Cooking oils
East Asian condiments
Japanese condiments
Korean condiments
Oil
Vegetable oils